The 2022 Miller Lite 200  was a NASCAR Whelen Modified Tour race that was held on May 14, 2022. It was contested over 200 laps on the  oval. It was the 3rd race of the 2022 NASCAR Whelen Modified Tour season. Tommy Baldwin Racing driver Doug Coby collected the victory in his first start of the season.

Report

Entry list 

 (R) denotes rookie driver.
 (i) denotes driver who is ineligible for series driver points.

Qualifying

Qualifying results

Race 

Laps: 213

Race statistics 

 Lead changes:  3
 Cautions/Laps: 5 cautions for 34 laps
 Time of race: 0:56:02
 Average speed:

References 

2022 NASCAR Whelen Modified Tour
2022 in sports in New York (state)
Miller Lite 200